Simon Webb may refer to:

Simon Webb (chess player) (1949–2005), British chess player
Simon Webb (footballer) (born 1978), Irish footballer
Simon Webb (civil servant) (born 1951), British policy director of the Ministry of Defence
Simon Webb (cricketer) (born 1981), former English cricketer

See also
Simon Webbe (born 1978), British singer
 Simeon Webb (fireman) (1874–1957), Afro-American railroad employee and survivor of the legendary Casey Jones accident